Aleksandr Vasilyevich Ivanov (born 4 August 1972) is a former Russian football player.

Ivanov played in the Russian Premier League with FC Dynamo Stavropol.

References

1972 births
Living people
Soviet footballers
Russian footballers
FC Dynamo Stavropol players
Russian Premier League players
Association football defenders
FC Volga Ulyanovsk players
FC Mashuk-KMV Pyatigorsk players